"Sugar Town" is a song written by songwriter-producer Lee Hazlewood and first recorded by American singer Nancy Sinatra in 1966. As a single released under the Reprise label, it peaked at number five on the Billboard Hot 100 chart in December 1966, while reaching number one on the Easy Listening chart in January 1967. It became a gold record. The song was included on Nancy Sinatra's LP, Sugar, also released in 1966, and was featured in her 1967 TV special Movin' with Nancy, released on home video in 2000.

Background 
The song is an allusion to sugar cubes laced with Lysergic acid diethylamide (LSD), thoughlike other songs Hazlewood wrote"Sugar Town" was deliberately enigmatic: directed to a young audience, yet outwardly tame enough to receive radio play.  Hazlewood denied that he had ever used LSD, or regularly partaken in drugs in general. He explained:

The B-side to "Sugar Town" was "Summer Wine", a popular duet also written by, and featuring, Hazlewood.

Personnel

According to the AFM contract sheet, the following musicians played on the track.

Billy Strange - listed as session leader
Don Lanier - listed as session conductor
Roy Caton
Ollie Mitchell
Don Randi
Carol Kaye
Don Bagley
Lou Morell
Al Casey
Glen Campbell
Gary Coleman
Hal Blaine

Cover versions
Hong Kong artist Nancy Sit covered the song, released as a single by Crane Brand Records in 1967.

Swedish band Shitkid covered the song on the 2017 album Fish.

In 2022, Mariano Garcia released an adaptation of this song as a single with the name "Tucumán". The lyrics allude to the province of Tucumán, Argentina, where the music video was shot.

In popular culture
In the 2009 romantic comedy film 500 Days of Summer, Zooey Deschanel performs the song.

In 2017, for the season 3 opener "Mabel", of the television series Better Call Saul, the original song plays in its entirety over the opening scene.

In the 2020 mystery comedy film The Kid Detective, the original song plays over the opening scenes, and again over the closing credits.

See also
List of number-one adult contemporary singles of 1967 (U.S.)
Sugar cubes as a medium for ingesting LSD

References

1966 singles
1967 singles
Nancy Sinatra songs
Songs written by Lee Hazlewood
1966 songs
Reprise Records singles
Songs about drugs
Lysergic acid diethylamide
The Selecter songs